The Third Urkullu Government is the incumbent regional government of the Basque Country led by President (Lehendakari) Iñigo Urkullu. It was formed in September 2020 after the regional election.

Council of Government 
The Council of Government is structured into the offices for the president, the two vice presidents and 11 ministries.

Departmental structure 
María Chivite's government is organised into several superior and governing units, whose number, powers and hierarchical structure may vary depending on the ministerial department.

 Unit/body rank

 Director-general
 Service

References

2020 establishments in the Basque Country (autonomous community)
Cabinets established in 2020
Cabinets of the Basque Country (autonomous community)